Waddell's Station was a stage stand on the old Butterfield Overland Mail route in Indian Territory. It was located in what is now Atoka County, Oklahoma. It is sometimes confused with Roger's Station, a post-Civil War stage stand and post office, which was three miles (5 km) in an easterly direction from Waddell's.

Waddell's Station was added to the National Register of Historic Places (#72001054) in 1972.

Sources

Shirk, George H. Oklahoma Place Names. Norman: University of Oklahoma Press, 1987:  .
Wright, Murial H.; George H. Shirk; Kenny A. Franks. Mark of Heritage. Oklahoma City: Oklahoma Historical Society, 1976
Wright, Muriel H. "The Butterfield Overland Mail One Hundred Years Ago", Chronicles of Oklahoma 35:1 (January 1957) 55-71 (accessed August 19, 2006).

Buildings and structures in Atoka County, Oklahoma
Butterfield Overland Mail in Indian Territory
Stagecoach stations on the National Register of Historic Places in Oklahoma
Transport infrastructure completed in 1858
National Register of Historic Places in Atoka County, Oklahoma
Stagecoach stations in Oklahoma